The South Central Regional Transit District operates a network of several local and intercity bus routes in southern New Mexico, serving Las Cruces, Alamogordo, Hatch/Garfield, Anthony, and Sunland Park, with three connections to El Paso, Texas, as well as serving many smaller communities along a network of eight fixed routes. Routes operate Monday through Friday, except the Yellow Line servicing Sunland Park, which operates Monday through Saturday. All routes cost $1 for adults, and $0.50 for children, seniors, students, and people with disabilities. Bus transfers between SCRTD buses are free. The service is supported primarily by federal grants and local funding from membership fees and Doña Ana County funding agreement for services.

History
The South Central Regional Transit District was created in November 2003 via the Regional Transit District Act signed by Governor Richardson.

Bus services launched February 2016. In 2016, the district with a two-year funding agreement with Doña Ana County initiated transit service on four bus routes from Las Cruces to Sunland Park, Anthony and Chaparral. Later that year, the district secured a 5311 grant to support the operation of bus service in Dona Ana County and a 5310 grant to enhance the Purple route operating from Anthony to Sunland Park with connections to El Paso's Westside Transit Center. In 2018 transit service frequency increased on three of the four routes and ridership grew by 61 percent. Further, the district updated its Five-Year Financial and Service Plan to reflect new services and grant funding programmed or received.

Google Maps 
SCRTD has collaborated with Google Maps to allow riders to view bus routes and the bus stops on the routes, to make navigating the bus routes easier.

Expansion 
In 2017 the District extended service to connect to El Paso County from Chaparral and Sunland Park. With additional funds, service frequency was improved. These actions improved ridership throughout the service area on all bus routes.  
In collaboration with the City of Sunland Park, SCRTD began operations in Sunland Park and implemented the Yellow Line servicing Sunland Park and connecting to the Downtown Transfer Center in El Paso, Texas.

Green energy  

In 2020, SCRTD purchased two hybrid-electric Gillig buses to service the Yellow Line. These buses are the first hybrid-electric buses to be implemented in Southern New Mexico. They are quiet, reliable, and fuel-efficient buses that provide many benefits. Some of the benefits of hybrid-electric buses are that they significantly reduce carbon emissions, reduce fuel consumption by around 33%, and they require less maintenance. They are also equally reliable as traditional buses, but have the added benefit of a smoother, quieter ride.
In 2020, SCRTD installed bus shelters with solar powered lighting. The solar powered lighting will help to provide an emissions free and safe environment for riders waiting at bus stops.

List of routes

 Red Line: Mesilla Valley Intermodal Transit Terminal to Anthony, New Mexico Transfer Center,

 Purple Line: Anthony Transfer Center to Sunland Park City Hall

 Yellow Line: Servicing Sunland Park, New Mexico with a connection at the El Paso, Texas Downtown Transfer Center

 Silver Line: Sunland Park City Hall to the El Paso Westside Transfer Center

 Green Line: Garfield Post Office via Highway 185 to NMSU Gerald Thomas Hall

 Turquoise Line: Anthony Transfer Center to El Paso Northgate via Chaparral

 Copper Line: Operates from the Greyhound Terminal to the Mesilla Valley Intermodal Transit Terminal located in downtown Las Cruces, New Mexico, to Mesilla, New Mexico.

References

External links 
 Official South Central Regional Transit District (SCRTD) website
 Las Cruces RoadRunner Transit website
 Mesilla Valley MPO website
 Dona Ana County website

Bus transportation in New Mexico
Transit agencies in the United States
Transportation in Doña Ana County, New Mexico
Transportation in Otero County, New Mexico
Transportation in Sierra County, New Mexico
Las Cruces, New Mexico
Alamogordo, New Mexico